Mastotermitidae is a family of termites with one sole living species, Mastotermes darwiniensis which is found only in northern Australia. The remaining  genera of this family are only known from the fossil record.

Genera
Numerous fossil taxa have been described in the Mastotermitidae, as well as in the genus Mastotermes. The family seems to have had a worldwide distribution until just a few million years ago, when all but the ancestors of the giant northern termite became extinct for unknown reasons.

Genera included in the Mastotermitidae are: 
 †Anisotermes Zhao et al Burmese amber, Myanmar, Cenomanian
 †Blattotermes Riek (Eocene-Oligocene of France, USA, and Australia)
 †Garmitermes Engel, Grimaldi, & Krishna Baltic amber, Eocene
 †Idanotermes Engel Baltic amber, Eocene
 †Khanitermes Engel, Grimaldi, & Krishna Shar-Tolgoy Formation, Dzun-Bain Formation, Mongolia, Aptian
 Mastotermes Froggatt (Cretaceous-Recent of Europe, Central America and Australia)
 †Miotermes Rosen (Miocene of Croatia, Germany, and France)
 †Spargotermes Emerson (Miocene-Pliocene of Brazil)
 †Valditermes Jarzembowski Weald Clay, United Kingdom, Hauterivian

References

Termites
Blattodea families
Extant Hauterivian first appearances